Arnold H. Harris (22 May 1934 – 6 October 2001) was the producer/director of WGN-TV's Chicago Cubs television broadcasts for 37 years from 1964 until his death.

Harris was born and died in Chicago, Illinois.  He joined WGN in 1956 while attending Drake University.  After his death at age 67 in 2001, the Cubs placed a flag of honor on the roof of Wrigley Field.

External links
Baseball takes a loss with passing of legend, pioneer  (to login page ASU Webdevil), published 10 October 2001, accessed 28 April 2006
Broadcaster Max Rauer's remembrance of Harris -Ron Wesley Maly blog published 11 October 2001, accessed 2 May 2008; Rauer was a Drake U classmate of Harris; Maly was a longtime Des Moines Register editor and 4x Iowa sportswriter of the year;

1934 births
2001 deaths
People from Chicago
Television producers from Illinois
American television directors
Drake University alumni